Da Derrty Versions: The Reinvention is a remix album by American rapper Nelly, released on November 25, 2003.

Track listing
"Intro" (1:25)
"Country Grammar (Jason "Jay E" Epperson Remix)" (featuring E-40) (4:59)
"Iz U" (5:41)
"E.I. (David Banner Remix)" (5:03)
"Ride wit Me (Jason "Jay E" Epperson Remix)" (featuring City Spud) (4:28)
"Batter Up (Jason "Jay E" Epperson Remix)" (featuring Murphy Lee, Ali, Chocolate Tai, King Jacob, Prentiss Church & Jung Tru) (6:57)
"If" (3:40)
"Hot in Here (Basement Beats Remix)" (3:45)
"Dilemma (Jermaine Dupri Remix)" (featuring Kelly Rowland & Ali) (5:06)
"King's Highway" (5:31)
"Groovin' Tonight" (featuring Brian McKnight, Ali & City Spud) (4:26)
"Air Force Ones (David Banner Remix)" (featuring David Banner & 8Ball) (5:10)
"Work It (Scott Storch Remix)" (featuring Justin Timberlake) (4:12)
"#1 (Remix)" (featuring Clipse & Postaboy) (5:07)
"Pimp Juice (Jason "Jay E" Epperson Remix)" (featuring Ron Isley) (6:00)
"Tip Drill Remix" (E.I.) (featuring St. Lunatics) (6:23)

Charts

Weekly charts

Year-end charts

Certifications

References

Nelly albums
Albums produced by Scott Storch
2003 remix albums
Universal Records remix albums